Carmel Inguanez is a Maltese diplomat and is the current Ambassador of Malta to Russia, having presented his credentials to Russian President Dmitry Medvedev on 12 October 2009.

References

Living people
Ambassadors of Malta to Russia
Year of birth missing (living people)